Emamzadeh Baba Ahmad (also Romanized as Emamzādeh Bābā Aḩmad; also known as Bābā Aḩmad and Tang-e Bābā Aḩmad) is a village in Qaleh-ye Khvajeh Rural District, in the Central District of Andika County, Khuzestan Province, Iran. At the 2006 census, its population was 350, in 53 families.

References 

Populated places in Andika County